The Singles is a compilation of singles by The Who that was released by Polydor in November 1984. It was not released in the United States or Canada, and it lacks a number of early singles.

The version of "I Can See for Miles" contained herein is not the classic single version, but a BBC live recording with a loud, overdubbed bass track.

Track listing
All songs written by Pete Townshend except where noted.

"Substitute" - 3:45
"I'm a Boy" - 2:37
"Happy Jack" - 2:14
"Pictures of Lily" - 2:43
"I Can See for Miles" (BBC Recording) - 4:05
"Magic Bus" - 3:20
"Pinball Wizard" - 3:00
"My Generation" - 3:18
"Summertime Blues" (Live) (Jerry Capehart and Eddie Cochran) - 3:22
"Won't Get Fooled Again" (Single version) - 3:38
"Let's See Action (Nothing Is Everything)" - 3:57
"Join Together" - 4:22
"5:15" (Single version) - 4:48
"Squeeze Box" - 2:40
"Who Are You" (Single version) - 5:00
"You Better You Bet" - 5:37
 Japanese pressings contain the mono version of "Magic Bus" (from the UK single)

In December 2011, The Singles was reissued as a 2-CD set in Japan on SHM-CD by Universal.

2011 Japanese Reissue Track Listing
Disc 1
 "I Can't Explain" - 2:06
 "Anyway, Anyhow, Anywhere" (Townshend, Roger Daltrey) - 2:42
 "My Generation" - 3:20
 "Substitute" - 3:49
 "I'm a Boy" - 2:43
 "Happy Jack" - 2:13
 "Pictures of Lily" - 2:46
 "The Last Time" (Mick Jagger, Keith Richards) - 2:55
 "I Can See for Miles" - 4:06
 "Dogs" - 3:07
 "Magic Bus" - 4:37
 "Pinball Wizard" - 3:05
 "See Me, Feel Me" (Single version) - 3:25
 "The Seeker" - 3:13

Disc 2
 "Summertime Blues" (Live) (Capehart, Cochran) - 3:25
 "Won't Get Fooled Again" (Single version) - 3:39
 "Let's See Action" - 4:00
 "Join Together" - 4:25
 "Relay" - 3:56
 "Long Live Rock" - 3:58
 "5:15" - 4:54
 "Squeeze Box" - 2:43
 "Who Are You" (Alternate mix) - 5:10
 "You Better You Bet" - 5:39
 "Don't Let Go the Coat" - 3:45
 "Athena" - 3:49

References

1984 compilation albums
The Who compilation albums
Polydor Records compilation albums